Pomp or pomps may refer to:

 POMP, a proteasome maturation protein
 Pomp, Kentucky, a community in the United States
 Pomps, a commune in the Pyrénées-Atlantiques department in southwestern France
 Pompḗ, usually translated as pomp or procession, the name of the first part of several Ancient Greek festivals, such as Dionysia and Lenaia
 Pomp rock, an alternative term for a rock music era also known as arena rock
 Slang for a Pompadour haircut
 Pomps, an alternative name for a Ghillies dance shoe
 Jubal Pomp, a Walt Disney comics character

People
 Numa Pompilius, also called Numa Pomp (753–673 BC; reigned 715-673 BC), legendary second king of Rome, succeeding Romulus
 Dirck Gerritsz Pomp (1544–1608), Dutch sailor of the 16th–17th century
 Jean Baptiste Charbonneau, explorer and fur trader

See also 
 Pomp and Circumstance Marches, a series of marches for orchestra composed by Sir Edward Elgar
 Pomper, a surname